Wibaux is a town in and the county seat of Wibaux County, Montana, United States. It is the only incorporated town in Wibaux County. The population was 589 at the 2020 census.

History 

The town originally had names such as Keith, Beaver, and Mingusville (named for Minnie and Gus Grisy, who ran the Post Office in the late 19th century). In 1895, the town was renamed for prominent local cattle rancher, Pierre Wibaux, who had immigrated to the area from France in 1883. Wibaux expanded his herds by buying stock from less fortunate ranchers.

After Wibaux's arrival, the town became a major cattle shipping center for the Northern Pacific Railroad, notably receiving some of the cattle from Theodore Roosevelt's Maltese Cross and Elkhorn ranches near Medora, North Dakota. The great cattle drives of the 1880s often passed by Wibaux on their way from Texas to the northern ranges.

Theodore Roosevelt had a famous encounter with a bully at Nolan's Hotel in Wibaux (Mingusville, at the time) shortly after moving to the North Dakota Badlands in 1884.  Arriving at the hotel late at night, Roosevelt was accosted by a drunk sheep herder carrying cocked revolvers in both hands, and ordered to buy drinks for the crowd.  Roosevelt pretended to move towards the bar, then punched the man three times in quick succession, causing the drunk to fire his revolvers as he fell.  The future president then took away the man's guns before several other occupants of the hotel dragged him out into a shed.

The National Register of Historic Places has three entries in Wibaux: The Pierre Wibaux House, St. Peter's Catholic Church, and the Wibaux Historical District.

Modern day

Wibaux operates a state travel center at the town's exit from Interstate 94, the Pierre Wibaux House Museum, and the Centennial Car Museum, which was sent to the New York World's Fair in 1964. At the western end of town, there is a statue of Pierre Wibaux that he commissioned in his will to look over the sloping landscape. Each year the town holds a summer festival, called the Ski Fest as homage to its predominantly Polish roots. 
The 2002 Vin Diesel movie, Knockaround Guys, was based (although not filmed) in Wibaux.

Geography and climate
Wibaux is located at  (46.986991, -104.189848). It is the easternmost town in Montana along Interstate 94 and runs a rest stop/information center for motorists using the highway that is only open in the summer between May and September and is closed the rest of the year.

Beaver Creek runs through the town and has been known to contain large Walleye and Northern Pike.

Demographics

2010 census
As of the census of 2010, there were 589 people, 278 households, and 153 families residing in the town. The racial makeup of the town was 96.4% White, 0.5% Native American, 0.7% Asian, 0.5% from other races, and 1.9% from two or more races. Hispanic or Latino of any race were 1.7% of the population.

There were 278 households, of which 23.4% had children under the age of 18 living with them, 41.4% were married couples living together, 7.2% had a female householder with no husband present, 6.5% had a male householder with no wife present, and 45.0% were non-families. 42.4% of all households were made up of individuals, and 17.3% had someone living alone who was 65 years of age or older. The average household size was 2.03 and the average family size was 2.76.

The median age in the town was 50.4 years. 19.5% of residents were under the age of 18; 4.3% were between the ages of 18 and 24; 19.3% were from 25 to 44; 31.7% were from 45 to 64; and 25.1% were 65 years of age or older. The gender makeup of the town was 47.4% male and 52.6% female.

2000 census
As of the census of 2000, there were 567 people, 239 households, and 139 families residing in the town. The population density was 532.3 people per square mile (204.6/km2). There were 321 housing units at an average density of 301.4 per square mile (115.8/km2). The racial makeup of the town was 98.06% White, 0.35% African American, 0.53% Native American, 0.18% from other races, and 0.88% from two or more races. Hispanic or Latino of any race were 0.71% of the population.

There were 239 households, out of which 25.1% had children under the age of 18 living with them, 46.9% were married couples living together, 8.8% had a female householder with no husband present, and 41.8% were non-families. 39.3% of all households were made up of individuals, and 21.3% had someone living alone who was 65 years of age or older. The average household size was 2.22 and the average family size was 3.00.

In the town, the population was spread out, with 23.1% under the age of 18, 5.8% from 18 to 24, 21.2% from 25 to 44, 23.1% from 45 to 64, and 26.8% who were 65 years of age or older. The median age was 45 years. For every 100 females there were 80.6 males. For every 100 females age 18 and over, there were 78.0 males.

The median income for a household in the town was $26,518, and the median income for a family was $36,250. Males had a median income of $25,893 versus $20,250 for females. The per capita income for the town was $18,105. About 2.9% of families and 10.2% of the population were below the poverty line, including 1.7% of those under age 18 and 14.6% of those age 65 or over.

Education
Wibaux Schools educates students from kindergarten through 12th grade. Wibaux County High School's team name is the Longhorns.

Wibaux Public Library serves the area.

References 

Towns in Wibaux County, Montana
County seats in Montana
1895 establishments in Montana